Kevin Coppock (9 May 1932 – 29 November 2016) was an Australian rules footballer who played with Richmond in the Victorian Football League (VFL).

Notes

External links 		
		
		
		
		
		
		
1932 births		
2016 deaths		
Australian rules footballers from Victoria (Australia)		
Richmond Football Club players
Maryborough Football Club players